In digital typography, Lucida Sans Unicode OpenType font from the design studio of Bigelow & Holmes is designed to support the most commonly used characters defined in version 1.0 of the Unicode standard. It is a sans-serif variant of the Lucida font family and supports Latin, Greek, Cyrillic and Hebrew scripts, as well as all the letters used in the International Phonetic Alphabet.

It is the first Unicode encoded font to include non-Latin scripts (Greek, Cyrillic, Hebrew). It was designed by Kris Holmes and Charles Bigelow in 1993, and was first shipped with the Microsoft Windows NT 3.1 operating system.

The font comes pre-installed with all Microsoft Windows versions since Windows 98. A nearly identical font, called Lucida Grande, shipped as the default system font with Apple's Mac OS X operating system, until switching to Helvetica Neue in 2014 with OS X Yosemite, and in addition to the above, also supports Arabic and Thai scripts.

Letters in the International Phonetic Alphabet, particularly upside down letters, are aligned for easy reading upside down. Thus, the font is among the most ideal for upside-down text, compared to other Unicode typefaces, which have the turned "t" and "h" characters aligned with their tops at the base line and thus appear out of line.

A flaw in Lucida Sans Unicode is in the combining low line character (U+0332) and the combining double low line character (U+0333), which are rendered as a blank or as a simple tiny underline when font-size is less than 238 point or so in word processors, whereas combining double low line is rendered a simple low line in web browsers, no matter which font is used.

Other well-known Unicode fonts include Code2000, Arial Unicode MS, and the various free software Unicode typeface projects.

See also
 List of typefaces
 Unicode typeface

References

 "The design of a Unicode font", by Charles Bigelow and Kris Holmes. Electronic Publishing, Vol. 6(3), 289-305 (September 1993).

External links
 Lucida Fonts Matrix
 Microsoft typography: Lucida Sans Unicode
 Lucida Sans Unicode, described by Roman Czyborra.

Unicode typefaces
Windows XP typefaces
Typefaces and fonts introduced in 1993
Humanist sans-serif typefaces
Typefaces designed by Kris Holmes
Typefaces designed by Charles Bigelow (type designer)
IPA typefaces